Bergen Bandyklubb is a Norwegian bandy club, founded in 1936 and based in Bergen. The club has won the national championship for women in 1999, 2000, 2001, 2002, and 2006.

Sources

Bandy clubs in Norway
Bandy clubs established in 1936